Ernest Durig (1894 in Zurich, Switzerland – 1962 in Washington, D.C., United States) was a sculptor and art forger, known for his faking of drawings by Auguste Rodin.

Durig claimed to have been a pupil of Rodin, but the only documentation of their having ever met is a single photograph.

As a sculptor, Durig, no doubt helped by his claimed link to Rodin, modelled busts for a number of notables in the United States establishment. His sitters included Mussolini, US President Harry S. Truman, and the actor Will Rogers. He sculpted a peace memorial for Greenwood, Wisconsin, from an artificial stone made using concrete and fine white sand. Unveiled in 1937, it was restored in 1982.

In July 2016 BBC Television screened an episode of Fake or Fortune?, in which a privately held watercolour of a Cambodian dancer, supposedly by Rodin, was exposed as a Durig fake.

The New York Museum of Modern Art holds a collection of his drawings. Durig's extensive career of forgery was first exposed in the 4 June 1965 issue of LIFE.

Bibliography

References

External links 

 Essay on Durig and Rodin
 Image of Durig with Rodin

1894 births
1962 deaths
Art forgers
Swiss sculptors
Artists from Zürich
Swiss emigrants to the United States